Goosebumps Series 2000 is a spin-off of the original  Goosebumps series by R. L. Stine. The cover design of the Series 2000 books was different from the original books, though the cover art was again by the same person, Tim Jacobus. There was no back tagline anymore, and the paragraphs at the back were excerpts from the book rather than a short summary of the story as the original books' back covers had. There was another difference with back covers too, as the "Reader Beware, You're In For A Scare!" of the original series was changed to "2000 Times The Scares!" and "Welcome to the new millennium of fear". Only 25 books were printed because of a dispute that R.L. Stine had with Scholastic. A 26th book, called "The Incredible Shrinking Fifth Grader" was planned and while it was canceled, Stine retooled it into a standalone book called "The Adventures of Shrink Man".

The main subject of the covers, the title, and R. L. Stine were printed in raised print, something only Goosebumps HorrorLand has other than Series 2000.

Sequels to Goosebumps books 
A few of the Series 2000 books are sequels to original Goosebumps books. Below is a list of those books:

 Bride of the Living Dummy and Slappy's Nightmare (sequels to Night of the Living Dummy III)
 Return to HorrorLand (sequel to One Day at HorrorLand)
 Return to Ghost Camp (sequel to Ghost Camp)

Episodes in the TV series 
The first two books, Cry of the Cat and Bride of the Living Dummy, were adapted for the Goosebumps television show, with the former being a two-part episode.

Books

See also

References

External links
 at Scholastic Press

Book series introduced in 1998
Goosebumps